Jerry Bright (born July 21, 1947) is an American former sprinter who specialised in the 200-meter dash. He ranked in the top six of that event nationally at the USA Track and Field Championships from 1967 to 1969. He set personal bests of 20.1 seconds for that event in 1968. He also had bests of 9.4 seconds for the 100-yard dash and 10.1 seconds for the 100-meter dash. His sole international medals came at the 1967 Pan American Games, where he was a relay gold medallist with the United States and a silver medallist in the 200 m behind the leading American athlete, John Carlos. Bright was also fourth in the 100 m Pan American final.

References
 Profile at trackfield.brinkster.net

1947 births
Living people
American male sprinters
Pan American Games track and field athletes for the United States
Athletes (track and field) at the 1967 Pan American Games
Pan American Games medalists in athletics (track and field)
Pan American Games gold medalists for the United States
Track and field athletes from Oakland, California
Medalists at the 1967 Pan American Games